Ala Wai may refer to:

 Ala Wai Canal, adjacent to Waikiki, Honolulu, Hawaii
 Ala Wai Harbor, a small boat and yacht harbor at the mouth of the canal